The 1906 British Isles heat wave occurred across the British Isles in August and September 1906. The heat wave had a comparable intensity to the 1990 heat wave. From 31 August to 3 September, the temperature in the UK exceeded  consecutively over much of the UK.

2 September was the hottest day of the month, as temperatures reached  in Bawtry; this remains the hottest September temperature of any day in the UK and the eighth-hottest day overall in the 20th century.

Scotland had temperatures reaching  at Gordon Castle, Moray, while Northern Ireland had temperatures reaching  in Armagh, County Armagh, both recorded on 1 September 1906.

September records

See also 
 Drought in the United Kingdom

References 

Heat waves in the United Kingdom
United Kingdom Heat Wave, 1906
United Kingdom Heat Wave, 1906
United Kingdom Heat Wave, 1906
1906 heat waves
August 1906 events
September 1906 events
1906 disasters in the United Kingdom